Houston International Airport may refer to:
 William P. Hobby Airport, previously Houston International Airport
 George Bush Intercontinental Airport, Houston, Texas' main international airport

See also
 Houston Airport (disambiguation)
 Houston County Airport (disambiguation)